John of Portugal is the name of several Portuguese kings and other members of the Portuguese Royal Family:

Kings
 John I of Portugal (13571433)
 John II of Portugal (14551495)
 John III of Portugal (15021557)
 John IV of Portugal (16041656)
 John V of Portugal (16891750)
 John VI of Portugal (17671826)

Infantes

 John, Duke of Valencia de Campos (c.1349c.1396), son of Peter I of Portugal and Inês de Castro
 John, Constable of Portugal (14001442), son of John I of Portugal
 John of Coimbra, Prince of Antioch (14311457), son of Infante Pedro, Duke of Coimbra

 John, Hereditary Prince of Portugal (1451), son of Afonso V of Portugal

 João Manuel, Hereditary Prince of Portugal (15371554), son of John III of Portugal
 João, Prince of Brazil (1688), son of Peter II of Portugal
 Infante João Francisco of Portugal (1763), son of Maria I of Portugal and Peter III of Portugal
 João Carlos, Prince of Beira (18211822), son of Peter IV of Portugal (Peter I of Brazil)
 Infante João, Duke of Beja (18421861), son of Maria II and Ferdinand II of Portugal

Others 
 João de Portugal (Dominican) (active 1626), Portuguese Dominican friar in the Roman Catholic Diocese of Viseu